Palmyra Northwestern High School is located northwest part of Macoupin County, Illinois. Four towns are included in the district. Hagamon, Hettick, Modesto, Palmyra, and Scottville all attend Northwestern High School.

External links
Northwestern Jr. Sr. High

Public high schools in Illinois
Schools in Macoupin County, Illinois